Witherscape is a progressive death metal band from Sweden run by multi-instrumentalists Dan Swanö and Ragnar Widerberg.

Witherscape released an album, The Inheritance, in 2013 which featured Eddie Risdal, Paul Kuhr, Joel Selsfors and Morten Jørgensen as musical guests.

Their most recent release is The Northern Sanctuary (2016).

Members
 Ragnar Widerberg - guitar, bass (2013–present)
 Dan Swanö – vocals, keyboards, drums (2013–present)

Discography

Albums
 The Inheritance (2013)
 The Northern Sanctuary (2016)

EPs
 The New Tomorrow (EP, 2014)

References

External links
 Official website
 Century Media Artist Page

Heavy metal duos
Swedish progressive metal musical groups
Swedish melodic death metal musical groups
Musical groups established in 2013
2013 establishments in Sweden